Flavius Valerius Severus (died September 307), also called Severus II, was a Roman emperor from 306 to 307. After failing to besiege Rome, he fled to Ravenna. It is thought that he was killed there or executed near Rome.

Background and early career 
Severus was of humble birth, born in Northern Illyria around the middle of the third century. A friend of emperor Galerius, he rose to become a senior officer in the Roman army, being nominated as caesar of the Western Roman Empire. According to Lactantius, Diocletian objected to Galerius's suggestion, saying in response, "What! That dancer, that habitual drunkard who turns night into day and day into night?" Galerius persisted, saying that Severus has served faithfully as paymaster and purveyor of the army. Diocletian acquiesced and Severus succeeded to the post of caesar on 1 May 305, thus becoming the junior colleague of Constantius I, augustus of the western half of empire.

Augustus, 306–307 
On the death of Constantius I in Britain in the summer of 306, Severus was promoted to augustus by Galerius. This was done as a reaction to the acclamation of Constantine I (Constantius' son) by his own soldiers at York. Lactantius reports that Galerius had done this to promote the older man to the higher office, while accepting the imperial symbols of Constantine and accepting him as a member of the Tetrarchy, albeit with the rank of caesar.

When Maxentius, the son of the retired emperor Maximian, revolted at Rome, Galerius sent Severus to suppress the rebellion. Severus moved towards Rome from his capital, Mediolanum, at the head of an army previously commanded by Maximian. Fearing the arrival of Severus, Maxentius offered Maximian the co-rule of the empire. Maximian accepted, and when Severus arrived under the walls of Rome and besieged it, his men deserted to Maximian, their old commander. Severus fled to Ravenna, an impregnable position. Maximian offered to spare his life and treat him humanely if he surrendered peaceably, which he did in March or April 307. Despite Maximian's assurance, Severus was nonetheless displayed as a captive and later imprisoned at Tres Tabernae. One belief is that when Galerius himself invaded Italy to suppress Maxentius and Maximian, the former ordered Severus's death, and that he was executed on September 307 at Tres Tabernae, near the current Cisterna di Latina. Lactantius reports that he was permitted to kill himself by opening his veins. Another belief is that Severus II was killed in Ravenna.

Severus was survived by his son Flavius Severianus, but he was eventually killed during his war against Licinius.

References

External links

	

3rd-century births
307 deaths
4th-century Roman emperors
Constantinian dynasty
Imperial Roman consuls
Tetrarchy
Valerii